The Saskatchewan Water Security Agency (before 2013, the Saskatchewan Watershed Authority) is an arm's length organization responsible for the management of water resources to ensure safe drinking water sources and reliable water supplies for economic, environmental, and social benefits in Saskatchewan, Canada. The Agency is a Treasury Board Crown Corporation administered by a board of directors appointed by the provincial government.Water Security Agency is located in Moose Jaw, SK, Canada and is part of the Water, Sewage and Other Systems Industry. Water Security Agency has 870 total employees across all of its locations and generates $63.62 million in sales (USD). (Sales figure is modelled). There are 1,121 companies in the Water Security Agency corporate family.

The Agency
 operates dams and related facilities,
 maintains an inventory of the quantity and quality of ground and surface water,
 administers the allocation of water,
 regulates and controls the flow of rivers, lakes, reservoirs, and other bodies of water,
 represents the provincial government when negotiating interprovincial and international water agreements,
 regulates water works and drainage works,
 develops flood forecasting and identify flood susceptible areas,
 promotes the efficient use of water for environmental and socio-economic benefits,
 develops watershed studies and research,
 protects watersheds, including ecosystems, erosion control, waterfowl conservation  and fish habitats,
 manages the Saskatchewan Safe Drinking Water Strategy

Dams, weirs, and reservoirs operated by the agency
The following is a list of dams, weirs, and reservoirs operated by the Saskatchewan Water Security Agency:

Avonlea Dam
Blackstrap North Dam
Blackstrap South Dam
Bradwell East Dam
Bradwell West Dam
Brightwater Creek Dam
Broderick East Dam
Broderick West Dam
Buffalo Pound Dam
Candle Lake Dam
Chicken Lake Dam
Cowan Lake Dam
Craven Dam
Crooked Lake Dam
Darmody Dam
Dellwood Brook Dam
Echo Lake Dam
Esterhazy Dam
Five Mile Dam
Gardiner Dam
Grant Devine Dam
Hugonard Dam
Katepwa Dam
Kingsway Dam

Kipahigan Lake Dam
Lac la Plonge Dam
Lac la Ronge Dam
Makwa Lake Control
Moose Mountain Dam
Moosomin Dam
Northminster Effuent Reservoir
Opuntia Lake Control
Pike Lake Water Supply
Qu'Appelle River Dam
Rafferty Dam
Round Lake Dam
Scott Dam
Spruce River Dam
Star City Dam
Stelcam Weir
Summercove Dam
Tee-Pee Creek Dam
Theodore Dam
Wascana Lake Weir
West Poplar Dam
Woody Lake Weir
Valeport Dam
Zelma Dam

See also
List of dams and reservoirs in Canada
List of lakes of Saskatchewan
SaskWater

References

External links

https://www.wsask.ca/Lakes-and-Rivers/Dams-and-Reservoirs/

Crown corporations of Saskatchewan
Water management authorities